The Kosovo national football team has played several matches dating back to 1992, which according to various sources and Football Federation of Kosovo are not counted as International "A" Matches and is reported that there were 15 such matches, most of them was played before membership in UEFA and FIFA.

History

Pre-independence

1990s
In the space of one year, Kosovo played two unofficial friendlies against teams such as against Macedonian Albanian club Shkëndija (5 February 1992), which it defeated 4–0 and against Albanian club Albpetrol Patos (16 February 1993), which it defeated 3–2, two days after the official friendly against Albania. 

In November 1999, five months after the end of the Kosovo War, Kosovo played a unofficial friendly against players of Kosovar origin playing in the diaspora and the match ended in a 4–3 home win with goals from Kushtrim Munishi (twice), Kujtim Shala and Enis Fetahu.

2000s
On 30 November 2003, Kosovo began the new decade by playing a unofficial friendly as part of the celebrations for the 91st Anniversary of the Independence of Albania against players of Albanian origin playing in Macedonia and the match ended in a 5–0 home deep win with goals from Enis Fetahu (twice), Malsor Gjonbalaj, Shpëtim Hasani and Enver Jashari.

Three years later, on 28 November 2006, Kosovo played a unofficial friendly as part of the celebrations for 94th Anniversary of the Independence of Albania against Albanian All-Stars and the match ended with a 3–3 home draw. The starting line-up of that match was Kushtrim Mushica (GK), Ahmed Januzi, Alban Dragusha, Arben Zhjeqi, Deniz Krasniqi, Hysni Gashi, Ilir Nallbani, Kristian Nushi, Mensur Duraku, Shaqir Halili and Uliks Emra. After the match against Albanian All-Stars, two more matches were held as against KEK (3–0) and Kosovo U21 (5–1).

After independence
On 14 June 2008, Kosovo for the first time since the declaration of independence played a unofficial friendly again against Albanian All-Stars and the match ended with a 0–3 home defeat. Whereas, on 28 March 2009, Kosovo under the alternative name Team Kosovo, played a unofficial friendly against Swedish club Malmö and the match ended with a 5–0 away deep defeat. After the match against Malmö, six more matches were held as against Kalmar (2–1), Neuchâtel Xamax (0–2), Halmstad (4–4), Renova (0–0), Wil (0–1), Eintracht Frankfurt (0–0), and in the end with Werder Bremen (2–0).

Fixtures and results

Head-to-head record

Notes and references

Notes

References

External links
 
Kosovo at National-Football-Teams.com
Kosovo at RSSSF

Senior (unofficial)
Lists of national association football team unofficial results